Elections to North Down Borough Council were held on 7 June 2001 on the same day as the other Northern Irish local government elections. The election used four district electoral areas to elect a total of 25 councillors.

Election results

Note: "Votes" are the first preference votes.

Districts summary

|- class="unsortable" align="centre"
!rowspan=2 align="left"|Ward
! % 
!Cllrs
! % 
!Cllrs
! %
!Cllrs
! %
!Cllrs
! %
!Cllrs
! %
!Cllrs
!rowspan=2|TotalCllrs
|- class="unsortable" align="center"
!colspan=2 bgcolor="" | UUP
!colspan=2 bgcolor="" | Alliance
!colspan=2 bgcolor="" | DUP
!colspan=2 bgcolor="" | UKUP
!colspan=2 bgcolor="" | NIWC
!colspan=2 bgcolor="white"| Others
|-
|align="left"|Abbey
|bgcolor="40BFF5"|30.0
|bgcolor="40BFF5"|2
|17.1
|1
|22.4
|2
|13.1
|1
|0.0
|1
|17.4
|0
|6
|-
|align="left"|	Ballyholme and Groomsport
|23.6
|2
|12.4
|1
|11.3
|1
|8.2
|0
|6.4
|1
|bgcolor="#DDDDDD"|38.1
|bgcolor="#DDDDDD"|2
|7
|-
|align="left"|Bangor West
|bgcolor="40BFF5"|27.8
|bgcolor="40BFF5"|2
|19.1
|2
|10.8
|1
|14.0
|0
|0.0
|0
|28.3
|1
|7
|-
|align="left"|Holywood
|bgcolor="40BFF5"|30.0
|bgcolor="40BFF5"|2
|24.6
|1
|15.0
|1
|0.0
|0
|8.3
|0
|22.1
|1
|5
|- class="unsortable" class="sortbottom" style="background:#C9C9C9"
|align="left"| Total
|27.3
|8
|17.6
|5
|14.3
|5
|9.3
|2
|3.6
|1
|27.9
|4
|25
|-
|}

Districts results

Abbey

1997: 1 x UUP, 1 x Alliance, 1 x UKUP, 1 x Conservative, 1 x DUP, 1 x PUP
2001: 2 x UUP, 2 x DUP, 1 x Alliance, 1 x UKUP
1997-2001 Change: UUP and DUP gain from Conservative and PUP

Ballyholme and Groomsport

1997: 2 x UUP, 2 x Independent Unionist, 1 x Alliance, 1 x Conservative, 1 x UKUP
2001: 2 x UUP, 2 x Independent, 1 x Alliance, 1 x DUP, 1 x Women's Coalition
1997-2001 Change: DUP and Women's Coalition gain from Conservative and UKUP, Independent Unionists (two seats) become Independent

Bangor West

1997: 2 x UUP, 2 x Alliance, 1 x UKUP, 1 x PUP, 1 x Independent
2001: 2 x UUP, 2 x Alliance, 1 x UKUP, 1 x DUP, 1 x Independent
1997-2001 Change: DUP gain from PUP

Holywood

1997: 2 x Alliance, 1 x UUP, 1 x DUP, 1 x Independent
2001: 2 x UUP, 1 x Alliance, 1 x DUP, 1 x Independent
1997-2001 Change: UUP gain from Alliance

References

North Down Borough Council elections
North Down